Greetings & Readings of Hunt Valley was the largest independent bookstore in Baltimore and was a member of the American Booksellers Association. The store occupied  of retail and warehouse space on the second floor of the main Hunt Valley Towne Centre plaza, the final northbound destination of the Baltimore Light Rail, before closing in January 2019.

History

Phyllis and Norton Baum founded the original Greetings & Readings in 1969 as a book and card shop occupying .

For 35 years, the store was located in Towson, Maryland, in the Loch Raven Plaza. After its closure, a new store was opened by Phyllis and Norton's son, Steven Baum; his wife Fran; his brother-in-law Stephen Spund and Spund's wife Amy.

The founder's son, Steven Baum, is president of the establishment. His brother-in-law Stephen Spund is vice-president. More than 90 workers were employed by Greetings & Readings in various departments which included gifts and jewelry, a Wi-Fi-enabled lounge, a Hallmark Gold Crown card section, a Vera Bradley boutique to make up what the store claimed was the premier independent gift store in Baltimore, Maryland. Greetings & Readings offered gifts and fashion from popular brands, and souvenires.

Greetings & Readings was named one of the coolest businesses in Baltimore by Expert Market US.

In January, 2010, wedding technology company WeddingWire, selected Greetings & Readings of Hunt Valley to receive the 2010 Bride’s Choice Awards™ for excellence in custom printing and personalized wedding invitation design. The invitation department was closed in 2018 to make room for expanding card and baby gift departments. The store hosted frequent book signings and other events including kids' story time readings.

The store closed in January 2019, citing a drop in sales and customers lost to online booksellers.

Community involvement

Greetings & Readings of Hunt Valley supported the efforts of the non-profit organization Literacy Works, Inc. which promotes increased literacy for adults in the Baltimore area. The store also partnered with the HELPS (Health Educators Linking Parents and Students) Coalition and sponsored the Hunt Valley Kids Club which began in May 2007.

From 2013, Greetings & Readings of Hunt Valley partnered with Baltimore's Enoch Pratt Free Library as the on-site bookseller for some of the library's public and private author events.

References

External links
 Greetings & Readings website
 Hunt Valley Towne Centre website

Independent bookstores of the United States
Bookstores in Maryland
Companies based in Baltimore